Walter Deane (April 23, 1848 – July 30, 1930) was an American amateur botanist and ornithologist. Born in Boston, Massachusetts, he graduated from Harvard College in 1870. He was a founding member of the New England Botanical Club and served as its president from 1908 to 1911. From 1897 to 1907 he was curator of William Brewster's ornithological museum, and prepared Brewster's Birds of the Cambridge Region. Deane is commemorated in the plant genus Deanea Coulter & Rose.

References

External links
 
 

1848 births
1930 deaths
19th-century American botanists
20th-century American botanists
American ornithologists
Harvard College alumni